Tony Mitchell (born 5 September 1951 in Sydney, Australia) is a songwriter and bass guitarist who rose to fame in the 1970s with the Australian rock band Sherbet. Tony co-wrote (with Garth Porter) some of Sherbet's biggest hits, including "Howzat" and "Magazine Madonna".

Howzat
In 1976, someone suggested to Tony Mitchell and keyboardist Garth Porter that Howzat might make a good title for a song because some of the members of Sherbet loved cricket. Despite Mitchell not being a good cricketer, he sat down with Garth Porter at Porter's Watsons Bay home to work on the idea. Mitchell soon came up with the "doo-doo, doo-doo" bass riff, after which the first thing that came into Porter's mind was the phrase "I caught you out."

The song became Sherbet's biggest hit, rising to #1 on the Australian charts, and #4 in the United Kingdom.

References

1951 births
Living people
Australian bass guitarists
Sherbet (band) members